Edwin Hipkiss (born 6 February 1947) is a New Zealand cricketer. He played in six first-class matches for Northern Districts in 1966/67.

See also
 List of Northern Districts representative cricketers

References

External links
 

1947 births
Living people
New Zealand cricketers
Northern Districts cricketers
People from Wallasey